Mircea Hava  (born  26 December 1956 in Oradea, Bihor County, Romania) is a Romanian politician, engineer, and member of the European Parliament. Hava was elected as member of the European Parliament on the list of the National Liberal Party (PNL) at the 2019 European Parliament election in Romania.

Hava was also mayor of Alba Iulia for 25 years, firstly between 1991 and 1992 and then once more from 1996 to 2019. He was also a member of the Democratic Party (PD) before joining the National Liberal Party (PNL).

In 2004, he was reelected  with more than 70% of the votes.

Orders and decorations
 Officer National Order of Merit – 2011
 Knight   National Order of Merit – 2004

References

Translated in part from the corresponding article in the Polish Wikipedia

Mayors of places in Romania
Democratic Liberal Party (Romania) politicians
National Liberal Party (Romania) politicians
Living people
1956 births
Recipients of the National Order of Merit (Romania)